Ayul Kaithi is a 1991 Indian Tamil-language crime drama film written and directed by K. Subash, starring Prabhu and Revathi. The film revolves around an escaped prisoner seemingly seeking to kill his ex-girlfriend. It was released on 29 June 1991.

Plot 

Chandrasekhar, a prisoner sentenced to life imprisonment, escapes from prison to seemingly kill his ex-girlfriend Nithiya. Sudharshan, a police officer, tries to catch him.

Cast 

Prabhu as Chandrasekhar alias Sekhar
Revathi as Nithiya
Goundamani as Sundarrajan
Chinni Jayanth as Chandrasekhar's friend
Jai Ganesh as Jeevanandham
Livingston as Sudharshan
Krishnamoorthy as Police officer
Vaani as Jeevanandham's wife
Vincent Roy as Kandhasamy
V. Gopalakrishnan as Police officer
John Babu in a special appearance

Soundtrack 
The music was composed by Shankar–Ganesh, with lyrics by Vaali.

Reception 
Sundarji of Kalki lauded the cinematography and Prabhu's performance.

References

External links 
 

1990s Tamil-language films
1991 crime drama films
1991 films
Films directed by K. Subash
Films scored by Shankar–Ganesh
Indian crime drama films